Lisa Palfrey (born 9 February 1967) is a Welsh actress. She is known for playing the roles of Gwenny in House of America (1997), Mrs Nice in Guest House Paradiso (1999), Maureen in Pride (2014), Mrs Dai Bread 1 in Under Milk Wood (2015), Cynthia in the Netflix original television series Sex Education and Eleanor James in the Sky One original television series COBRA.

Early life
Palfrey was born in Wales on 9 February 1967, her mother is Eiry Palfrey, an actress and author. She attended Ysgol Gyfun Llanhari, a Welsh language secondary school near Pontyclun.

Career
Palfrey started acting at the age of 20 when she played the role of 15-year-old girl, Jane Sanderson, in the BBC One television series The District Nurse. Her first major role was in the film The Englishman Who Went Up a Hill But Came Down a Mountain. She has gone on to star in the cult film House of America, and appeared as Melanie Collier in the medical drama television series Casualty as well as Inspector Tracey McAndrew in the third series of the police procedural television series Line of Duty. She played the role of Rhiannedd Frost in the Welsh soap opera Pobol y Cwm.

Palfrey has performed in a number of plays, including the original production of David Eldridge's Festen, The Iceman Cometh, Under The Blue Sky, and Tom Wells's The Kitchen Sink.

In 2019, Palfrey played the role of Cynthia in the Netflix original series Sex Education.

In 2020, Palfrey played the role of government minister Eleanor James in the Sky One original television drama series COBRA, written by Ben Richards and starring Robert Carlyle as British Prime Minister Robert Sutherland. She played the part of Pam Green in the BBC Drama Chloe in 2022.

Personal life 
Palfrey has a daughter, Lowri Palfrey, who is also an actress.

Filmography

Film

Television

Video game 
 Doctor Who: Attack of the Graske (2005), as Mum

References

External links
 

Living people
Welsh soap opera actresses
Welsh television actresses
People educated at Ysgol Gyfun Garth Olwg
Welsh film actresses
1967 births